Up in Smoke is the second studio album by American rappers Indo G and Lil' Blunt. It was released on December 5, 1995 via Cloud 9 Records. Recording sessions took place at Kiva Recording Studio and Cotton Row Recording Studio in Memphis, Tennessee.

Track listing
 "Think Like a G" - 4:51
 "20's" - 4:33
 "7 Feet Deep" (featuring S.M.K. Sean Pross) - 3:28
 "G's Don't Play" - 4:25
 "Straight From Tenn" - 3:56
 "Mr. President" - 4:54
 "Cocaine" - 3:47
 "Hoes" - 3:31
 "Hang in There Playa's" - 4:34
 "Freak the Funk" - 3:55
 "Breaker 1-9" - 5:01
 "Redrum" - 3:11

References

1995 albums
Indo G albums
Collaborative albums